Tame Valley Junction, also known as Doe Bank Junction, is a canal junction at the western limit of the Tame Valley Canal where it meets the Walsall Canal, south of Walsall, in the West Midlands, England.

History
The Walsall Canal eventually formed a through route between the Birmingham Canal Navigations main line at Pudding Green, and the Wyrley and Essington Canal at Birchills Junction, but it was built in several stages over many years. The first section from Pudding Lane Junction to Ryders Green Junction was part of the Wednesbury Canal, which ran to Hill Top in West Bromwich, and opened in 1769. The next part to be opened was authorised by the Act of Parliament for the Birmingham and Fazeley Canal, although it was never connected to their main line. It was built by the Birmingham Canal Navigations, as the two companies merged once the Act had been obtained. It ran from Ryders Green Junction to Broadwaters, a mining complex near Moxley, and opened in 1786. This section includes the site of the Tame Valley Junction.

A connection from Broadwaters to Walsall was first proposed in 1793, and the link was eventually opened in 1799. The through route was completed after the merger of the Wyrley and Essington and the Birmingham Canal Navigations. A short branch containing eight locks linking Walsall to Birchills was opened in 1841.

The Tame Valley Canal was a solution to the problem of congestion at Farmers Bridge Locks, which was the main link between the Birmingham system and the route to London via the Warwick and Birmingham Canal. The canal provided a connection from Tame Valley Junction to Salford Junction, from where another new canal, the Birmingham and Warwick Junction Canal connected to Bordesley Junction. Both canals were authorised at the same time and opened on 14 February 1844. Together they provided a northern bypass around the congestion. The route from Salford Junction to Warwick and on to London became part of the Grand Union Canal in 1929.

Location

The Tame Valley Canal has towpaths on both sides, and the Walsall Canal towpath is on the west bank at the junction. The cast iron bridge with brick abutments which carries the towpath over the Walsall Canal to the north of the junction is a grade II listed structure, as is the similar bridge to the south.

See also

Canals of the United Kingdom
History of the British canal system

Bibliography

References

Canal junctions in England
Canals in the West Midlands (county)
Birmingham Canal Navigations